Stephen Andrew Feinberg (born March 29, 1960) is an American businessman and investor active in hedge fund management and private equity. He is the co-founder and Chief Executive Officer (CEO) of Cerberus Capital Management. As of March 2019, his net worth is US$1.5 billion. In 2017 Cerberus also owned DynCorp, which is a major national security contractor with the US government, charging billions for overseas military and police training. On May 11, 2018, U.S. President Donald Trump named Feinberg to head the President's Intelligence Advisory Board.

Early life and education
Feinberg was born to a Jewish family and raised in The Bronx, New York.  When aged eight, his family moved to Spring Valley, New York, a suburb of New York City.  His father was a steel salesman. He graduated with an A.B. in politics from Princeton University in 1982 after completing a 94-page long senior thesis titled "The Politics of Prostitution and Drug Legalization."  While a student at Princeton, Feinberg captained the tennis team and joined the Reserve Officers' Training Corps.

Professional career
After graduating from college, Feinberg worked as a trader at Drexel Burnham in 1982 and later at Gruntal & Co.

In 1992, at the age of 32, Feinberg co-founded Cerberus Capital Management with William L. Richter.  At the time the firm had $10 million under management; its assets under management have since grown to over $30 billion in 2016. In 1999, the firm hired former vice president Dan Quayle as a chairman of Cerberus Global Investment. In 2006, the firm hired former United States Secretary of the Treasury John Snow, who serves as a chairman of Cerberus.

In May 2011, Feinberg stated that he believed residential mortgage-backed securities may present "a real opportunity for continued investment for quite a period of time" and that there were opportunities in buying assets from European banks.

Feinberg has been critical about the pay received by private equity executives, stating, "In general, I think that all of us are way overpaid in this business. It is almost embarrassing." He has also noted in comments made in 2011 that smaller private equity fund sizes may be better for investor returns: "If your goal is to maximize your return as opposed to assets under management, I think you can be most effective with a big company infrastructure and a little bit smaller fund size."

Feinberg has been described as "secretive" in The New York Times.  In 2007, Feinberg told Cerberus shareholders, "If anyone at Cerberus has his picture in the paper and a picture of his apartment, we will do more than fire that person. We will kill him. The jail sentence will be worth it."

Cerberus is the parent company of DynCorp, which is a major national security contractor with the U.S. government.

Political involvement
Feinberg is a major Republican donor. In 2016, he served on the Trump Economic Advisory Council during Donald Trump's presidential campaign, donated nearly $1.5 million to pro-Trump PACs, and co-hosted a $50,000 per person Republican National Committee and Trump fundraising dinner alongside other financiers. In February 2017, the New York Times reported that President Trump will assign Feinberg a role in the White House leading a review of the US intelligence agencies.

He is a member of The Business Council in Washington, DC, an association of chief executive officers from a broad range of companies who meet several times a year for high-level policy discussions.

Personal
Feinberg reportedly made $50 million in 2004. He splits time between his homes on Manhattan's Upper East Side and Greenwich, Connecticut with his wife Gisela (née Sanchez).

References

|-

1960 births
Living people
20th-century American businesspeople
21st-century American businesspeople
American billionaires
American chief executives of financial services companies
American financial traders
American financiers
American hedge fund managers
American investors
20th-century American Jews
American money managers
American political fundraisers
Businesspeople from Greenwich, Connecticut
Businesspeople from New York City
Cerberus Capital Management
Drexel Burnham Lambert
People from Spring Valley, New York
People from the Bronx
Princeton University alumni
Private equity and venture capital investors
21st-century American Jews